58 Squadron or 58th Squadron may refer to:

 No. 58 Squadron RAF, a unit of the Royal Air Force
 58th Fighter Squadron, a unit of the United States Air Force
 58th Airlift Squadron, a unit of the United States Air Force
 58th Strategic Weather Squadron, a unit of the United States Air Force
 58th Air Transport Squadron, an inactive United States Air Force unit
 58th Rescue Squadron, a unit of the United States Air Force
 58th Weather Reconnaissance Squadron, an inactive United States Air Force squadron
 58 Field Squadron, Royal Engineers, a unit of the British Army
 58th Squadron, a fictional unit in the television series Space: Above and Beyond

See also
 Jagdstaffel 58, a unit of the Imperial German Army 
 58th Division (disambiguation)
 58th Regiment (disambiguation)